Gianmaria Zanandrea (born 26 May 1999) is an Italian footballer who plays as a defender for  club Piacenza on loan from Avellino.

Club career
He made his Serie C debut for Juventus U23 on 24 September 2018 in a game against Carrarese.

On 18 August 2020, he joined Mantova, newly promoted to Serie C.

On 31 August 2021, he joined Perugia on loan.

On 3 August 2022, he joined Avellino on permanent basis. On 31 January 2023, Zanandrea moved on loan to Piacenza.

International
He represented Italy at the 2018 UEFA European Under-19 Championship, in which Italy was the runner-up.

References

External links
 
 

1999 births
Living people
Sportspeople from the Province of Vicenza
Footballers from Veneto
Italian footballers
Italy youth international footballers
Association football defenders
Serie B players
Serie C players
Juventus Next Gen players
Mantova 1911 players
A.C. Perugia Calcio players
U.S. Avellino 1912 players
Piacenza Calcio 1919 players